Claudia Lau (born 11 November 1992) is a Hong Kong competitive swimmer.

She qualified to the 2016 Summer Olympics in Rio de Janeiro, and was selected to represent Hong Kong in the women's 100 metre backstroke and 200 metre backststroke.

References

1992 births
Living people
Hong Kong female backstroke swimmers
Olympic swimmers of Hong Kong
Swimmers at the 2016 Summer Olympics
Swimmers at the 2010 Asian Games
Swimmers at the 2014 Asian Games
Swimmers at the 2018 Asian Games
Medalists at the 2010 Asian Games
Medalists at the 2014 Asian Games
Asian Games bronze medalists for Hong Kong
Asian Games medalists in swimming